Paul Guinan is an American writer and comic book artist. Some of his most famous works are the Boilerplate robot or DC's Chronos. He is a founding member of Helioscope studio. Paul Guinan is part of the husband-and-wife team with Anina Bennett who have been collaborating in print since 1989. He is currently working on the historical graphic novel Aztec Empire.

Early career
The Portland, writer Paul Guinan started out at First Comics, retouching the art on some of the first manga translations published in America. While working for First Comics, he co-created with writer John Francis Moore the time-travelling DC Comics hero Chronos.

Boilerplate
Paul Guinan and Anina Bennett's most famous work is probably Boilerplate, a series about a fictional robot which would have existed in the Victorian era and early 20th century. Originally featured on a website created by Guinan in 2000, Boilerplate details the history of a remarkable robot built in the late 19th century, and features photoshopped "archival images." In reality, the robot is actually a  articulated model which was seen interacting with historical figures, such as Teddy Roosevelt and Pancho Villa, the famous Mexican bandit that invaded America during the Battle of Columbus on March 9, 1916. Edward Wyatt of the New York Times called boilerplate "Deliciously detailed." At one point even J. J. Abrams wanted to develop a project with the 1893 robot.

Seminars 
Paul Guinan and Anina Bennett are regulars of the comic con scene and often give seminars.

Multimedia work

Published Books
 Guinan, Paul; Bennett, Anina (2012). Boilerplate: History's Mechanical Marvel. Abrams. . -  Total pages:  168  
 Guinan, Paul; Bennett, Anina (2012). Frank Reade. Harry N. Abrams. . - Total pages: 176

Comic Con
Paul Guinan was an official guest of the following:
2011 San Diego Comic-Con

Bibliography

Notes

References

 

 - Total pages: 168

External links
Aztec Empire Graphic novel created by Paul Guinan

Living people
1963 births
American comics artists
Inkpot Award winners